This is a list of the mammal species recorded in Peru. There are 417 mammal species in Peru, of which five are critically endangered, nine are endangered, thirty-two are vulnerable, and ten are near threatened.

The following tags are used to highlight each species' conservation status as assessed by the International Union for Conservation of Nature:

Some species were assessed using an earlier set of criteria. Species assessed using this system have the following instead of near threatened and least concern categories:

Subclass: Theria

Infraclass: Eutheria

Order: Sirenia (manatees and dugongs)

Sirenia is an order of fully aquatic, herbivorous mammals that inhabit rivers, estuaries, coastal marine waters, swamps, and marine wetlands. All four species are endangered.
Family: Trichechidae
Genus: Trichechus
 Amazonian manatee, Trichechus inunguis VU

Order: Cingulata (armadillos)

The armadillos are small mammals with a bony armored shell. They are native to the Americas. There are around 20 extant species.
Family: Dasypodidae (armadillos)
Subfamily: Dasypodinae
Genus: Dasypus
 Greater long-nosed armadillo, Dasypus kappleri LC
 Nine-banded armadillo, Dasypus novemcinctus LC
 Hairy long-nosed armadillo, Dasypus pilosus VU
Subfamily: Tolypeutinae
Genus: Cabassous
 Southern naked-tailed armadillo, Cabassous unicinctus LC
Genus: Priodontes
 Giant armadillo, Priodontes maximus VU

Order: Pilosa (anteaters, sloths and tamanduas)

The order Pilosa is extant only in the Americas and includes the anteaters, sloths, and tamanduas.
Suborder: Folivora
Family: Bradypodidae (three-toed sloths)
Genus: Bradypus
 Brown-throated three-toed sloth, Bradypus variegatus LC
Family: Choloepodidae (two-toed sloths)
Genus: Choloepus
 Linnaeus's two-toed sloth, Choloepus didactylus LC
 Hoffmann's two-toed sloth, Choloepus hoffmanni LC
Suborder: Vermilingua
Family: Cyclopedidae
Genus: Cyclopes
 Silky anteater, Cyclopes didactylus LC
Family: Myrmecophagidae (American anteaters)
Genus: Myrmecophaga
 Giant anteater, Myrmecophaga tridactyla NT
Genus: Tamandua
 Northern tamandua, Tamandua mexicana LC
 Southern tamandua, Tamandua tetradactyla LC

Order: Primates

The order Primates contains humans and their closest relatives: lemurs, lorisoids, monkeys, and apes.
Suborder: Haplorhini
Infraorder: Simiiformes
Parvorder: Platyrrhini (New World monkeys)
Family: Cebidae
Subfamily: Callitrichinae
Genus: Callithrix
 Pygmy marmoset, Cebuella pygmaea LC
Genus: Leontocebus
 Brown-mantled tamarin, Leontocebus fuscicollis LC
 Illiger's saddle-back tamarin, Leontocebus illigeri LC
 Red-mantled saddle-back tamarin, Leontocebus lagonotus LC
 Andean saddle-back tamarin, Leontocebus leucogenys LC
 Black-mantled tamarin, Leonotcebus nigricollis LC
 Geoffroy's saddle-back tamarin, Leontocebus nigrifrons LC
 Golden-mantled tamarin, Leontocebus tripartitus LC
 Weddell's saddle-back tamarin, Leontocebus weddelli LC
Genus: Saguinus
 Emperor tamarin, Saguinus imperator LC
 White-lipped tamarin, Saguinus labiatus LC
 Moustached tamarin, Saguinus mystax LC
Genus: Callimico
 Goeldi's marmoset, Callimico goeldii VU
Subfamily: Cebinae
Genus: Cebus
 Humboldt's white-fronted capuchin, Cebus albifrons LC
 Shock-headed capuchin, Cebus cuscinus NT
 Spix's white-fronted capuchin, Cebus unicolor
 Marañón white-fronted capuchin, Cebus yuracus
Genus: Sapajus
 Large-headed capuchin, Sapajus macrocephalus LC
Genus: Saimiri
 Black-capped squirrel monkey, Saimiri boliviensis LC
 Humboldt's squirrel monkey, Saimiri cassiquiarensis 
Family: AotidaeGenus: Aotus Peruvian night monkey, Aotus miconax VU
 Nancy Ma's night monkey, Aotus nancymaae LC
 Black-headed night monkey, Aotus nigriceps LC
 Spix's night monkey, Aotus vociferans LC
Family: Pitheciidae
Subfamily: Callicebinae
Genus: Callicebus Brown titi, Callicebus brunneus LC
 Coppery titi, Callicebus cupreus LC
 White-tailed titi, Callicebus discolor LC
 Lucifer titi, Callicebus lucifer LC
 Rio Mayo titi, Callicebus oenanthe VU
Subfamily: Pitheciinae
Genus: Pithecia Equatorial saki, Pithecia aequatorialis LR/lc
 Rio Tapajós saki, Pithecia irrorata LC
 Monk saki, Pithecia monachus LC
Genus: Cacajao Bald uakari, Cacajao calvus NT
Family: Atelidae
Subfamily: Alouattinae
Genus: Alouatta Mantled howler, Alouatta palliata LC
 Venezuelan red howler, Alouatta seniculus LC
Subfamily: Atelinae
Genus: Ateles White-fronted spider monkey, Ateles belzebuth VU
 Peruvian spider monkey, Ateles chamek LC
Genus: Lagothrix Gray woolly monkey, Lagothrix cana NT
 Brown woolly monkey, Lagothrix lagothricha LR/lc
 Silvery woolly monkey, Lagothrix poeppigii NT
Genus: Oreonax Yellow-tailed woolly monkey, Oreonax flavicauda CR

Order: Rodentia (rodents)

Rodents make up the largest order of mammals, with over 40% of mammalian species. They have two incisors in the upper and lower jaw which grow continually and must be kept short by gnawing.
Suborder: Hystricognathi
Family: Erethizontidae (New World porcupines)
Subfamily: Erethizontinae
Genus: Coendou Bicolor-spined porcupine, Coendou bicolor LR/lc
Family: Chinchillidae (viscachas and chinchillas)
Genus: Chinchilla Short-tailed chinchilla, Chinchilla chinchilla EN extirpated
Genus: Lagidium Northern viscacha, Lagidium peruanum LR/lc
 Southern viscacha, Lagidium viscacia D
Family: Dinomyidae (pacarana)
Genus: Dinomys Pacarana, Dinomys branickii VU
Family: Caviidae (guinea pigs)
Subfamily: Caviinae
Genus: Cavia Guinea pig, Cavia porcellus LR/lc
 Montane guinea pig, Cavia tschudii LR/lc
Genus: Galea Common yellow-toothed cavy, Galea musteloides LR/lc
Subfamily: Hydrochoerinae (capybaras and rock cavies)
Genus: Hydrochoerus Capybara, Hydrochoerus hydrochaeris LR/lc
Family: Dasyproctidae (agoutis and pacas)
Genus: Dasyprocta Black agouti, Dasyprocta fuliginosa LR/lc
 Kalinowski agouti, Dasyprocta kalinowskii DD
 Central American agouti, Dasyprocta punctata LR/lc
Genus: Myoprocta Red acouchi, Myoprocta acouchy LR/lc
 Red acouchi, Myoprocta exilis DD
Family: Cuniculidae
Genus: Cuniculus Lowland paca, Cuniculus paca LC
 Mountain paca, Cuniculus taczanowskii NT
Family: Ctenomyidae
Genus: Ctenomys White-toothed tuco-tuco, Ctenomys leucodon LR/lc
 Highland tuco-tuco, Ctenomys opimus LR/lc
 Peruvian tuco-tuco, Ctenomys peruanus LR/lc
Family: Abrocomidae
Genus: Abrocoma Ashy chinchilla rat, Abrocoma cinerea LR/lc
Family: Echimyidae
Subfamily: Dactylomyinae
Genus: Dactylomys Bolivian bamboo rat, Dactylomys boliviensis LR/lc
 Amazon bamboo rat, Dactylomys dactylinus LR/lc
 Montane bamboo rat, Dactylomys peruanus DD
Subfamily: Echimyinae
Genus: Echimys Peruvian tree-rat, Echimys rhipidurus DD
 Dark spiny tree-rat, Echimys saturnus LR/lc
Genus: Isothrix Yellow-crowned brush-tailed rat, Isothrix bistriata LR/nt
Genus: Pattonomys Bare-tailed armored tree-rat, Pattonomys occasius CR
Subfamily: Eumysopinae
Genus: Mesomys Ferreira's spiny tree rat, Mesomys hispidus LR/lc
 Woolly-headed spiny tree-rat, Mesomys leniceps LR/lc
Genus: Proechimys Short-tailed spiny rat, Proechimys brevicauda LR/lc
 Cuvier's spiny rat, Proechimys cuvieri LR/lc
 Pacific spiny rat, Proechimys decumanus LR/lc
 Long-tailed spiny rat, Proechimys longicaudatus LR/lc
 Napo spiny rat, Proechimys quadruplicatus LR/lc
 Simon's spiny rat, Proechimys simonsi LR/lc
 Steere's spiny rat, Proechimys steerei LR/lc
Suborder: Sciurognathi
Family: Sciuridae (squirrels)
Subfamily: Sciurillinae
Genus: Sciurillus Neotropical pygmy squirrel, Sciurillus pusillus LR/lc
Subfamily: Sciurinae
Tribe: Sciurini
Genus: Microsciurus Amazon dwarf squirrel, Microsciurus flaviventer LR/lc
Genus: Sciurus Bolivian squirrel, Sciurus ignitus LR/lc
 Northern Amazon red squirrel, Sciurus igniventris LR/lc
 Junín red squirrel, Sciurus pyrrhinus LR/lc
 Sanborn's squirrel, Sciurus sanborni LR/nt
 Southern Amazon red squirrel, Sciurus spadiceus LR/lc
 Guayaquil squirrel, Sciurus stramineus LR/lc
Family: Cricetidae
Subfamily: Sigmodontinae
Genus: Abrothrix Andean altiplano mouse, Abrothrix andinus LR/lc
 Jelski's altiplano mouse, Abrothrix jelskii LR/lc
Genus: Aegialomys Yellowish oryzomys, Aegialomys xanthaeolus LR/lc
Genus: Akodon Highland grass mouse, Akodon aerosus LR/lc
 White-bellied grass mouse, Akodon albiventer LR/lc
 Bolivian grass mouse, Akodon boliviensis LR/lc
 Smoky grass mouse, Akodon fumeus LR/lc
 Junin grass mouse, Akodon juninensis LR/lc
 Koford's grass mouse, Akodon kofordi LR/lc
 Thespian grass mouse, Akodon mimus LR/lc
 Soft grass mouse, Akodon mollis LR/lc
 El Dorado grass mouse, Akodon orophilus LR/lc
 Altiplano grass mouse, Akodon puer LR/lc
 Puno grass mouse, Akodon subfuscus LR/lc
 Silent grass mouse, Akodon surdus LR/lc
 Cloud forest grass mouse, Akodon torques LR/lc
Genus: Andinomys Andean mouse, Andinomys edax LR/lc
Genus: Auliscomys Bolivian big-eared mouse, Auliscomys boliviensis LR/lc
 Painted big-eared mouse, Auliscomys pictus LR/lc
 Andean big-eared mouse, Auliscomys sublimis LR/lc
Genus: Calomys Andean vesper mouse, Calomys lepidus LR/lc
 Peruvian vesper mouse, Calomys sorellus LR/lc
Genus: Chibchanomys Chibchan water mouse, Chibchanomys trichotis LR/nt
Genus: Chinchillula Altiplano chincilla mouse, Chinchillula sahamae LR/lc
Genus: Eligmodontia Andean gerbil mouse, Eligmodontia puerulus LR/lc
Genus: Eremoryzomys Gray rice rat, Eremoryzomys polius LR/lc
Genus: Euryoryzomys MacConnell's rice rat, Euryoryzomys macconnelli LR/lc
 Elegant rice rat, Euryoryzomys nitidus LR/lc
Genus: Galenomys Garlepp's mouse, Galenomys garleppi LR/lc
Genus: Handleyomys Black-eared rice rat, Handleyomys melanotis DD
Genus: Holochilus Amazonian marsh rat, Holochilus sciureus LR/lc
Genus: Hylaeamys Western Amazonian oryzomys, Hylaeamys perenensis LC
 Yungas rice rat, Hylaeamys yunganus LR/lc
Genus: Ichthyomys Stolzmann's crab-eating rat, Ichthyomys stolzmanni LR/lc
Genus: Lenoxus Andean rat, Lenoxus apicalis LR/nt
Genus: Melanomys Zuniga's dark rice rat, Melanomys zunigae LR/lc
Genus: Microryzomys Highland small rice rat, Microryzomys altissimus LR/lc
 Forest small rice rat, Microryzomys minutus LR/lc
Genus: Neacomys Northern bristly mouse, Neacomys spinosus LR/lc
 Narrow-footed bristly mouse, Neacomys tenuipes LR/lc
Genus: Necromys Pleasant bolo mouse, Necromys amoenus LR/lc
Genus: Nectomys Western Amazonian nectomys, Nectomys apicalis LC
 Amazonian mouse, Nectomys rattus LC
Genus: Neotomys Andean swamp rat, Neotomys ebriosus LR/lc
Genus: Nephelomys Tomes's rice rat, Nephelomys albigularis LR/lc
 Ecuadorian rice rat, Nephelomys auriventer LR/lc
 Keays's rice rat, Nephelomys keaysi LR/lc
 Light-footed rice rat, Nephelomys levipes LR/nt
Genus: Neusticomys Peruvian fish-eating rat, Neusticomys peruviensis EN
Genus: Oecomys Bicolored arboreal rice rat, Oecomys bicolor LR/lc
 Dusky arboreal rice rat, Oecomys phaeotis LR/lc
 Robert's arboreal rice rat, Oecomys roberti LR/lc
 Trinidad arboreal rice rat, Oecomys trinitatis LR/lc
Genus: Oligoryzomys Andean pygmy rice rat, Oligoryzomys andinus LR/lc
 Sandy pygmy rice rat, Oligoryzomys arenalis LR/lc
 Destructive pygmy rice rat, Oligoryzomys destructor DD
 Small-eared pygmy rice rat, Oligoryzomys microtis LR/lc
Genus: Oreoryzomys Peruvian rice rat, Oreoryzomys balneator LR/lc
Genus: Oxymycterus Small hocicudo, Oxymycterus hiska VU
 Incan hocicudo, Oxymycterus inca LR/lc
 Paramo hocicudo, Oxymycterus paramensis LR/lc
Genus: Phyllotis Friendly leaf-eared mouse, Phyllotis amicus LR/lc
 Andean leaf-eared mouse, Phyllotis andium LR/lc
 Darwin's leaf-eared mouse, Phyllotis darwini LR/lc
 Definitive leaf-eared mouse, Phyllotis definitus LR/lc
 Gerbil leaf-eared mouse, Phyllotis gerbillus LR/lc
 Master leaf-eared mouse, Phyllotis magister LR/lc
 Bunchgrass leaf-eared mouse, Phyllotis osilae LR/lc
Genus: Punomys Puna mouse, Punomys lemminus LR/lc
Genus: Rhipidomys Coues's climbing mouse, Rhipidomys couesi LR/lc
 White-footed climbing mouse, Rhipidomys leucodactylus LR/lc
 Atlantic Forest climbing mouse, Rhipidomys mastacalis LR/lc
 Yellow-bellied climbing mouse, Rhipidomys ochrogaster LR/nt
Genus: Scolomys Ucayali spiny mouse, Scolomys ucayalensis EN
Genus: Sigmodon Peruvian cotton rat, Sigmodon peruanus LR/lc
Genus: Thomasomys Golden Oldfield mouse, Thomasomys aureus LR/lc
 Ash-colored Oldfield mouse, Thomasomys cinereus LR/lc
 Daphne's Oldfield mouse, Thomasomys daphne LR/lc
 Peruvian Oldfield mouse, Thomasomys eleusis LR/lc
 Slender Oldfield mouse, Thomasomys gracilis LR/lc
 Inca Oldfield mouse, Thomasomys incanus LR/lc
 Strong-tailed Oldfield mouse, Thomasomys ischyurus LR/lc
 Kalinowski's Oldfield mouse, Thomasomys kalinowskii LR/lc
 Distinguished Oldfield mouse, Thomasomys notatus LR/nt
 Thomas's Oldfield mouse, Thomasomys pyrrhonotus LR/lc
 Rosalinda's Oldfield mouse, Thomasomys rosalinda LR/lc
 Taczanowski's Oldfield mouse, Thomasomys taczanowskii LR/lc

Order: Lagomorpha (lagomorphs)

The lagomorphs comprise two families, Leporidae (hares and rabbits), and Ochotonidae (pikas). Though they can resemble rodents, and were classified as a superfamily in that order until the early 20th century, they have since been considered a separate order. They differ from rodents in a number of physical characteristics, such as having four incisors in the upper jaw rather than two.
Family: Leporidae (rabbits, hares)
Genus: Sylvilagus Andean tapetí, Sylvilagus andinus DD
Common tapetí, Sylvilagus brasiliensis EN

Order: Eulipotyphla (shrews, hedgehogs, moles, and solenodons)

Eulipotyphlans are insectivorous mammals. Shrews and solenodons closely resemble mice, hedgehogs carry spines, while moles are stout-bodied burrowers.
Family: Soricidae (shrews)
Subfamily: Soricinae
Tribe: Blarinini
Genus: Cryptotis Thomas' small-eared shrew, Cryptotis thomasi LR/lc

Order: Chiroptera (bats)

The bats' most distinguishing feature is that their forelimbs are developed as wings, making them the only mammals capable of flight. Bat species account for about 20% of all mammals.
Family: Noctilionidae
Genus: Noctilio Lesser bulldog bat, Noctilio albiventris LR/lc
 Greater bulldog bat, Noctilio leporinus LR/lc
Family: Vespertilionidae
Subfamily: Myotinae
Genus: Myotis Silver-tipped myotis, Myotis albescens LR/lc
 Atacama myotis, Myotis atacamensis VU
 Hairy-legged myotis, Myotis keaysi LR/lc
 Black myotis, Myotis nigricans LR/lc
 Riparian myotis, Myotis riparius LR/lc
 Velvety myotis, Myotis simus LR/lc
Subfamily: Vespertilioninae
Genus: Eptesicus Little black serotine, Eptesicus andinus LR/lc
 Brazilian brown bat, Eptesicus brasiliensis LR/lc
 Argentine brown bat, Eptesicus furinalis LR/lc
 Big brown bat, Eptesicus fuscus LR/lc
 Harmless serotine, Eptesicus innoxius VU
Genus: Histiotus Big-eared brown bat, Histiotus macrotus LR/nt
 Small big-eared brown bat, Histiotus montanus LR/lc
Genus: Lasiurus Desert red bat, Lasiurus blossevillii LR/lc
 Hoary bat, Lasiurus cinereus LR/lc
Subfamily: Tomopeatinae
Genus: Tomopeas Blunt-eared bat, Tomopeas ravus VU
Family: Molossidae
Genus: Cynomops Cinnamon dog-faced bat, Cynomops abrasus LR/nt
 Southern dog-faced bat, Cynomops planirostris LR/lc
Genus: Eumops Black bonneted bat, Eumops auripendulus LR/lc
 Dwarf bonneted bat, Eumops bonariensis LR/lc
 Wagner's bonneted bat, Eumops glaucinus LR/lc
 Sanborn's bonneted bat, Eumops hansae LR/lc
 Western mastiff bat, Eumops perotis LR/lc
Genus: Molossops Rufous dog-faced bat, Molossops neglectus LR/nt
 Dwarf dog-faced bat, Molossops temminckii LR/lc
Genus: Molossus Black mastiff bat, Molossus ater LR/lc
 Coiban mastiff bat, Molossus coibensis LR/nt
 Velvety free-tailed bat, Molossus molossus LR/lc
Genus: Mormopterus Kalinowski's mastiff bat, Mormopterus kalinowskii VU
 Incan little mastiff bat, Mormopterus phrudus EN
Genus: Nyctinomops Peale's free-tailed bat, Nyctinomops aurispinosus LR/lc
 Broad-eared bat, Nyctinomops laticaudatus LR/lc
 Big free-tailed bat, Nyctinomops macrotis LR/lc
Genus: Promops Big crested mastiff bat, Promops centralis LR/lc
 Brown mastiff bat, Promops nasutus LR/lc
Genus: Tadarida Mexican free-tailed bat, Tadarida brasiliensis LR/nt
Family: Emballonuridae
Genus: Centronycteris Shaggy bat, Centronycteris maximiliani LR/lc
Genus: Cormura Wagner's sac-winged bat, Cormura brevirostris LR/lc
Genus: Diclidurus Northern ghost bat, Diclidurus albus LR/lc
 Greater ghost bat, Diclidurus ingens VU
 Lesser ghost bat, Diclidurus scutatus LR/lc
Genus: Peropteryx Greater dog-like bat, Peropteryx kappleri LR/lc
 White-winged dog-like bat, Peropteryx leucoptera LR/lc
 Lesser dog-like bat, Peropteryx macrotis LR/lc
Genus: Rhynchonycteris Proboscis bat, Rhynchonycteris naso LR/lc
Genus: Saccopteryx Greater sac-winged bat, Saccopteryx bilineata LR/lc
 Frosted sac-winged bat, Saccopteryx canescens LR/lc
 Lesser sac-winged bat, Saccopteryx leptura LR/lc
Family: Mormoopidae
Genus: Mormoops Ghost-faced bat, Mormoops megalophylla LR/lc
Genus: Pteronotus Naked-backed bat, Pteronotus davyi LR/lc
 Big naked-backed bat, Pteronotus gymnonotus LR/lc
 Parnell's mustached bat, Pteronotus parnellii LR/lc
 Wagner's mustached bat, Pteronotus personatus LR/lc
Family: Phyllostomidae
Subfamily: Phyllostominae
Genus: Glyphonycteris Behni's big-eared bat, Glyphonycteris behnii VU
 Davies's big-eared bat, Glyphonycteris daviesi LR/nt
 Tricolored big-eared bat, Glyphonycteris sylvestris LR/nt
Genus: Lonchorhina Tomes's sword-nosed bat, Lonchorhina aurita LR/lc
Genus: Lophostoma Pygmy round-eared bat, Lophostoma brasiliense LR/lc
 Carriker's round-eared bat, Lophostoma carrikeri VU
 White-throated round-eared bat, Lophostoma silvicolum LR/lc
Genus: Macrophyllum Long-legged bat, Macrophyllum macrophyllum LR/lc
Genus: Micronycteris Brosset's big-eared bat, Micronycteris brosseti DD
 Hairy big-eared bat, Micronycteris hirsuta LR/lc
 Little big-eared bat, Micronycteris megalotis LR/lc
 White-bellied big-eared bat, Micronycteris minuta LR/lc
Genus: Mimon Striped hairy-nosed bat, Mimon crenulatum LR/lc
Genus: Phylloderma Pale-faced bat, Phylloderma stenops LR/lc
Genus: Phyllostomus Pale spear-nosed bat, Phyllostomus discolor LR/lc
 Lesser spear-nosed bat, Phyllostomus elongatus LR/lc
 Greater spear-nosed bat, Phyllostomus hastatus LR/lc
Genus: Tonatia Greater round-eared bat, Tonatia bidens LR/lc
 Stripe-headed round-eared bat, Tonatia saurophila LR/lc
Genus: Trachops Fringe-lipped bat, Trachops cirrhosus LR/lc
Genus: Trinycteris Niceforo's big-eared bat, Trinycteris nicefori LR/lc
Genus: Vampyrum Spectral bat, Vampyrum spectrum LR/nt
Subfamily: Lonchophyllinae
Genus: Lionycteris Chestnut long-tongued bat, Lionycteris spurrelli LR/lc
Genus: Lonchophylla Handley's nectar bat, Lonchophylla handleyi VU
 Western nectar bat, Lonchophylla hesperia VU
 Orange nectar bat, Lonchophylla robusta LR/lc
 Thomas's nectar bat, Lonchophylla thomasi LR/lc
Genus: Platalina Long-snouted bat, Platalina genovensium VU
Subfamily: Glossophaginae
Genus: Anoura Tailed tailless bat, Anoura caudifer LR/lc
 Handley's tailless bat, Anoura cultrata LR/lc
 Geoffroy's tailless bat, Anoura geoffroyi LR/lc
 Broad-toothed tailless bat, Anoura latidens LR/nt
Genus: Choeroniscus Intermediate long-tailed bat, Choeroniscus intermedius LR/nt
 Minor long-nosed long-tongued bat, Choeroniscus minor LR/lc
Genus: Glossophaga Commissaris's long-tongued bat, Glossophaga commissarisi LR/lc
 Pallas's long-tongued bat, Glossophaga soricina LR/lc
Genus: Lichonycteris Dark long-tongued bat, Lichonycteris obscura LR/lc
Subfamily: Carolliinae
Genus: Carollia Chestnut short-tailed bat, Carollia castanea LR/lc
 Seba's short-tailed bat, Carollia perspicillata LR/lc
Genus: Rhinophylla Fischer's little fruit bat, Rhinophylla fischerae LR/nt
 Dwarf little fruit bat, Rhinophylla pumilio LR/lc
Subfamily: Stenodermatinae
Genus: Artibeus Andersen's fruit-eating bat, Artibeus anderseni LR/lc
 Brown fruit-eating bat, Artibeus concolor LR/nt
 Fraternal fruit-eating bat, Artibeus fraterculus VU
 Silver fruit-eating bat, Artibeus glaucus LR/lc
 Jamaican fruit bat, Artibeus jamaicensis LR/lc
 Great fruit-eating bat, Artibeus lituratus LR/lc
 Dark fruit-eating bat, Artibeus obscurus LR/nt
 Pygmy fruit-eating bat, Artibeus phaeotis LR/lc
Genus: Chiroderma Salvin's big-eyed bat, Chiroderma salvini LR/lc
 Little big-eyed bat, Chiroderma trinitatum LR/lc
 Hairy big-eyed bat, Chiroderma villosum LR/lc
Genus: Enchisthenes Velvety fruit-eating bat, Enchisthenes hartii LR/lc
Genus: Mesophylla MacConnell's bat, Mesophylla macconnelli LR/lc
Genus: Sphaeronycteris Visored bat, Sphaeronycteris toxophyllum LR/lc
Genus: Sturnira Aratathomas's yellow-shouldered bat, Sturnira aratathomasi LR/nt
 Bidentate yellow-shouldered bat, Sturnira bidens LR/nt
 Bogota yellow-shouldered bat, Sturnira bogotensis LR/lc
 Hairy yellow-shouldered bat, Sturnira erythromos LR/lc
 Little yellow-shouldered bat, Sturnira lilium LR/lc
 Louis's yellow-shouldered bat, Sturnira luisi LR/lc
 Greater yellow-shouldered bat, Sturnira magna LR/nt
 Lesser yellow-shouldered bat, Sturnira nana VU
 Tilda's yellow-shouldered bat, Sturnira tildae LR/lc
Genus: Uroderma Tent-making bat, Uroderma bilobatum LR/lc
 Brown tent-making bat, Uroderma magnirostrum LR/lc
Genus: Vampyressa Bidentate yellow-eared bat, Vampyressa bidens LR/nt
 Brock's yellow-eared bat, Vampyressa brocki LR/nt
 Melissa's yellow-eared bat, Vampyressa melissa LR/nt
 Southern little yellow-eared bat, Vampyressa pusilla LR/lc
Genus: Vampyrodes Great stripe-faced bat, Vampyrodes caraccioli LR/lc
Genus: Platyrrhinus Short-headed broad-nosed bat, Platyrrhinus brachycephalus LR/lc
 Thomas's broad-nosed bat, Platyrrhinus dorsalis LR/lc
 Heller's broad-nosed bat, Platyrrhinus helleri LR/lc
 Buffy broad-nosed bat, Platyrrhinus infuscus LR/nt
 White-lined broad-nosed bat, Platyrrhinus lineatus LR/lc
 Greater broad-nosed bat, Platyrrhinus vittatus LR/lc
Subfamily: Desmodontinae
Genus: Desmodus Common vampire bat, Desmodus rotundus LR/lc
Genus: Diaemus White-winged vampire bat, Diaemus youngi LR/lc
Genus: Diphylla Hairy-legged vampire bat, Diphylla ecaudata LR/nt
Family: Furipteridae
Genus: Amorphochilus Smokey bat, Amorphochilus schnablii VU
Genus: Furipterus Thumbless bat, Furipterus horrens LR/lc
Family: Thyropteridae
Genus: Thyroptera Peters's disk-winged bat, Thyroptera discifera LR/lc
 LaVal's disk-winged bat, Thyroptera lavali DD
 Spix's disk-winged bat, Thyroptera tricolor LR/lc

Order: Cetacea (whales)

The order Cetacea includes whales, dolphins and porpoises. They are the mammals most fully adapted to aquatic life with a spindle-shaped nearly hairless body, protected by a thick layer of blubber, and forelimbs and tail modified to provide propulsion underwater. Most live in the ocean, but there are fresh water dolphins in the Amazon basin.
Suborder: Mysticeti
Family: Balaenopteridae
Family: Balaenidae
Genus: Eubalaena Southern right whale, Eubalaena australis LR/cd
Subfamily: Balaenopterinae
Genus: Balaenoptera Common minke whale, Balaenoptera acutorostrata LR/nt
 Antarctic minke whale, Balaenoptera bonaerensis DD
 Bryde's whale, Balaenoptera edeni DD
 Sei whale, Balaenoptera borealis EN
 Fin whale, Balaenoptera physalus EN
 Blue whale, Balaenoptera musculus EN
Subfamily: Megapterinae
Genus: Megaptera Humpback whale, Megaptera novaeangliae VU
Suborder: Odontoceti
Superfamily: Platanistoidea
Family: Iniidae
Genus: Inia Amazon river dolphin, Inia geoffrensis DD
Family: Phocoenidae
Genus: Phocoena Burmeister's porpoise, Phocoena spinipinnis DD
Family: Physeteridae
Genus: Physeter Sperm whale, Physeter macrocephalus VU
Family: Kogiidae
Genus: Kogia Pygmy sperm whale, Kogia breviceps LR/lc
 Dwarf sperm whale, Kogia sima LR/lc
Family: Ziphidae
Subfamily: Ziphiinae
Genus: Ziphius Cuvier's beaked whale, Ziphius cavirostris DD
Subfamily: Hyperoodontinae
Genus: Mesoplodon Blainville's beaked whale, Mesoplodon densirostris DD
 Ginkgo-toothed beaked whale, Mesoplodon ginkgodens DD
 Gray's beaked whale, Mesoplodon grayi DD
 Pygmy beaked whale, Mesoplodon peruvianus DD
Family: Delphinidae (marine dolphins)
Genus: Steno Rough-toothed dolphin, Steno bredanensis DD
Genus: Sotalia Tucuxi, Sotalia fluviatilis DD
Genus: Stenella Pantropical spotted dolphin, Stenella attenuata LR/cd
 Spinner dolphin, Stenella longirostris LR/cd
Genus: Delphinus Long-beaked common dolphin, Delphinus capensis DD
 Short-beaked common dolphin, Delphinus delphis LC
Genus: Tursiops Common bottlenose dolphin, Tursiops truncatus LC
Genus: Lagenodelphis Fraser's dolphin, Lagenodelphis hosei DD
Genus: Lissodelphis Southern right whale dolphin, Lissodelphis peronii DD
Genus: Sagmatias Dusky dolphin, Sagmatias obscurus DD
Genus: Feresa Pygmy killer whale, Feresa attenuata DD
Genus: Grampus Risso's dolphin, Grampus griseus DD
Genus: Peponocephala Melon-headed whale, Peponocephala electra DD
Genus: Pseudorca False killer whale, Pseudorca crassidens LR/lc
Genus: Orcinus Orca, Orcinus orca LR/cd
Genus: Globicephala Short-finned pilot whale, Globicephala macrorhynchus DD
 Long-finned pilot whale, Globicephala melas DD

Order: Carnivora (carnivorans)

There are over 260 species of carnivorans, the majority of which feed primarily on meat. They have a characteristic skull shape and dentition.
Suborder: Feliformia
Family: Felidae (cats)
Subfamily: Felinae
Genus: LeopardusPampas cat L. colocola 
Andean mountain cat L. jacobitusOcelot L. pardalis 
Oncilla L. tigrinus 
Margay L. wiedii 
Genus: PumaCougar, P. concolor 
Genus: Herpailurus Jaguarundi, H. yagouaroundi 
Subfamily: Pantherinae
Genus: Panthera Jaguar, P. onca 
Suborder: Caniformia
Family: Canidae (dogs, foxes)
Genus: Lycalopex Culpeo, Lycalopex culpaeus LC
 South American gray fox, Lycalopex griseus LC
 Sechura fox, Lycalopex sechurae DD
Genus: Atelocynus Short-eared dog, Atelocynus microtis DD
Genus: Speothos Bush dog, Speothos venaticus VU
Genus: Chrysocyon Maned wolf, Chrysocyon brachyurus NT
Family: Ursidae (bears)
Genus: Tremarctos Spectacled bear, Tremarctos ornatus VU
Family: Procyonidae (raccoons)
Genus: Procyon Crab-eating raccoon, Procyon cancrivorusGenus: Nasua South American coati, Nasua nasuaGenus: Potos Kinkajou, Potos flavusGenus: Bassaricyon Eastern lowland olingo, Bassaricyon alleniFamily: Mustelidae (mustelids)
Genus: Eira Tayra, Eira barbaraGenus: Galictis Lesser grison, Galictis cuja Greater grison, Galictis vittataGenus: Lontra Marine otter, Lontra felina EN
 Neotropical river otter, Lontra longicaudis DD
Genus: Neogale Amazon weasel, Neogale africana DD
 Long-tailed weasel, Neogale frenataGenus: Pteronura Giant otter, Pteronura brasiliensis EN
Family: Otariidae (eared seals, sealions)
Genus: Arctocephalus South American fur seal, Arctocephalus australisGenus: Otaria South American sea lion, Otaria flavescensFamily: Mephitidae
Genus: Conepatus Molina's hog-nosed skunk, Conepatus chinga Striped hog-nosed skunk, Conepatus semistriatusOrder: Perissodactyla (odd-toed ungulates)

The odd-toed ungulates are browsing and grazing mammals. They are usually large to very large, and have relatively simple stomachs and a large middle toe.
Family: Tapiridae (tapirs)
Genus: Tapirus Mountain tapir, Tapirus pinchaque EN
 Brazilian tapir, Tapirus terrestris VU

Order: Artiodactyla (even-toed ungulates)

The even-toed ungulates are ungulates whose weight is borne about equally by the third and fourth toes, rather than mostly or entirely by the third as in perissodactyls. There are about 220 artiodactyl species, including many that are of great economic importance to humans.
Family: Tayassuidae (peccaries)
Genus: Dicotyles Collared peccary, Dicotyles tajacu LC
Genus: Tayassu White-lipped peccary, Tayassu pecari NT
Family: Camelidae (camels, llamas)
Genus: Lama Guanaco, Lama guanicoe LR/lc
 Vicuña, Lama vicugna LR/cd
Family: Cervidae (deer)
Subfamily: Capreolinae
Genus: Blastocerus Marsh deer, Blastocerus dichotomus VU
Genus: Hippocamelus Taruca, Hippocamelus antisensis DD
Genus: Mazama Red brocket, Mazama americana DD
 Dwarf brocket, Mazama chunyi DD
 Gray brocket, Mazama gouazoupira DD
Genus: Odocoileus White-tailed deer, Odocoileus virginianus LR/lc
Genus: Pudu Northern pudu, Pudu mephistophiles LR/nt
Subfamily: Cervinae
Genus: Dama European fallow deer, D. dama LC introduced

Infraclass: Metatheria

Order: Didelphimorphia (common opossums)

Didelphimorphia is the order of common opossums of the Western Hemisphere. Opossums probably diverged from the basic South American marsupials in the late Cretaceous or early Paleocene. They are small to medium-sized marsupials, about the size of a large house cat, with a long snout and prehensile tail.
Family: Didelphidae (American opossums)
Subfamily: Caluromyinae
Genus: Caluromys Brown-eared woolly opossum, Caluromys lanatus LR/nt
Genus: Caluromysiops Black-shouldered opossum, Caluromysiops irrupta VU
Genus: Glironia Bushy-tailed opossum, Glironia venusta VU
Subfamily: Didelphinae
Genus: Chironectes Water opossum, Chironectes minimus LR/nt
Genus: Didelphis Common opossum, Didelphis marsupialis LR/lc
Genus: Gracilinanus Aceramarca gracile opossum, Gracilinanus aceramarcae CR
 Agile gracile opossum, Gracilinanus agilis LR/nt
Genus: Hyladelphys Kalinowski's mouse opossum, Hyladelphys kalinowskii DD
Genus: Marmosa Anderson's mouse opossum, Marmosa andersoni CR
 Rufous mouse opossum, Marmosa lepida LR/nt
 Linnaeus's mouse opossum, Marmosa murina LR/lc
 Bare-tailed woolly mouse opossum, Marmosa regina LR/lc
 Robinson's mouse opossum, Marmosa robinsoni LR/lc
 Red mouse opossum, Marmosa rubra LR/lc
Genus: Marmosops Tschudi's slender opossum, Marmosops impavidus LR/nt
 White-bellied slender opossum, Marmosops noctivagus LR/lc
 Delicate slender opossum, Marmosops parvidens LR/nt
Genus: Metachirus Brown four-eyed opossum, Metachirus nudicaudatus LR/lc
Genus: Monodelphis Sepia short-tailed opossum, Monodelphis adusta LR/lc
 Emilia's short-tailed opossum, Monodelphis emiliae VU
 Osgood's short-tailed opossum, Monodelphis osgoodi VU
Genus: Philander Anderson's four-eyed opossum, Philander andersoni LR/lc
 Gray four-eyed opossum, Philander opossum LR/lc
Genus: Thylamys White-bellied fat-tailed mouse opossum, Thylamys pallidior LR/lc
 Tate's fat-tailed mouse opossum, Thylamys tatei DD

Order: Paucituberculata (shrew opossums)

There are six extant species of shrew opossum. They are small shrew-like marsupials confined to the Andes.
Family: Caenolestidae
Genus: Caenolestes Gray-bellied caenolestid, C. caniventer 
Genus: Lestoros Incan caenolestid, L. inca''

See also
List of chordate orders
List of Peruvian monkey species
List of prehistoric mammals
Lists of mammals by region
Mammal classification
List of mammals described in the 2000s

Notes

References
 

Peru
mammals
'
Peru